The Volkswagen Touran is a car manufactured by German automaker Volkswagen since 2003 and sold in Europe and other select markets. A compact multi-purpose vehicle (MPV), it fills a gap in Volkswagen's model lineup between the Volkswagen Golf, with which it shares its platform, and the Volkswagen Sharan, its larger counterpart, which ceased production in 2022. The vehicle has been sold in Japan as the Golf Touran and the crossover-styled variant as the CrossTouran. The name 'Touran' is derived from the combination of 'Tour' and 'Sharan'. Despite the similarity of their names, the Touran is not related to the North American market Volkswagen Routan. The vehicle is delivered in five or seven seat versions.

First generation (Typ 1T; 2003)

Announced back in August 2002, the Touran, whose production started in December 2002 and sales commenced in 2003, is the first Volkswagen MPV based on a Golf platform, more precisely the first vehicle on PQ35 platform. It joined Volkswagen's existing MPV line up that included the Sharan and Caravelle (Volkswagen Bus).

It can be considered an extended version of the Golf Plus, since their front ends are similar in size, while the Touran's rear overhang is  longer (and therefore a seven-seater, while the Golf Plus is a five seater).

The Touran introduced electro-mechanical steering, a first in its class and for Volkswagen. It is able to vary the weight of the steering depending on the road speed. Due to the lack of energy consumption in idle it also improves the overall efficiency of the vehicle. The Touran was the first vehicle to use Volkswagen's 2.0 TDI engine.

The engines are EURO 4 compliant, except the 1.9 TDi when paired with the DSG (direct shift gearbox). The Touran launched with a six speed manual gearbox as standard, and a DSG for the 1.9 TDI Engines.

Safety
The initial test of the Touran in 2003, resulted in a four star rating for adult protection. Volkswagen made slight changes to the Touran from November 2003, adding "an intelligent reminder for the driver and front passenger to buckle their seat belts." This allowed the Touran to be retested the same year, scoring a single extra point, and so giving the car a five star rating for adult protection:

Facelift (2006)

The Touran received a facelift for the October 2006 Paris Motor Show.

Park Assist
The 2007 model year Touran was the first production vehicle in the Volkswagen Group to be released with the new Park Assist technology. Park Assist helps the driver parallel park the vehicle. Firstly, after having activated the feature and whilst travelling up to 30 km/h Park Assist uses sensors to attempt to identify a suitable parking spot (defined as 0.8 metres longer than the length of the vehicle).

The driver then stops ahead of the parking spot, releases the steering wheel, but continues working the gears, accelerator and brake pedal as advised by the display panels, as the Park Assist controls the steering to park the vehicle.

CrossTouran
At the December 2006 Bologna Motor Show, Volkswagen released the third Cross vehicle designed by Volkswagen Individual GmbH.

The CrossTouran is distinguished from a standard Touran by its 17-inch alloy wheels, redesigned plastic guards which ape a crossover vehicle, and a  higher suspension/chassis setup that is optional for standard Tourans in Europe.

All CrossTouran engines are EU4 compliant.

Petrol engines
1.6 with 75 kW / 102 hp
1.4 TSI with 103 kW / 140 hp
2.0 TSI with 125 kW / 170 hp

Diesel engines
1.9 TDI with 77 kW / 105 hp
2.0 TDI with 103 kW / 140 hp
2.0 TDI with 125 kW / 170 hp

Second facelift (2010)
When the vehicle was re-released to the markets in August 2010, the Touran was updated to the newer Golf VI platform (PQ35). This included as new features compared to the previous generation the option for DCC (Volkswagen's adaptive suspension system), Light-Assist for Xenon Headlights, an improved Park-Assist System that can also handle perpendicular park positions and updated infotainment systems. The aerodynamics of the car were also improved, the Cw improved from 0,31 to 0,32 to 0,29.

In late 2010, SAIC-VW released the new Touran in China. Though its front was updated to the German style, the tail keeps the design of the previous generation model. The electronic systems of this domestically produced car were upgraded as its relative in Europe. A 1.4 TSI, which can output 93 kW, was added to the new model.

They replaced the 1.6 and 1.9 TDI from the previous model. The 1.2,  and 1.6 TDI  were also available as BlueMotion, Volkswagen's low fuel consumption vehicle program.

Engines
The Touran is available with petrol, diesel and compressed natural gas (CNG) engines.

The diesel models of the Touran offer better fuel economy.

The car is delivered with a five- (1.6 only) and six speed manual transmissions, Tiptronic six speed automatic transmission (in 1.6, 1.6 FSI and 2.0 FSI (2003 to 2006 only)) or the DSG twin clutch automatic transmission; the 1.4 TSI, the 1.6 FSI from 2003 to 2006, the 1.9 TDI from 2003 to 2008, and the 2.0 TDI uses the six speed version, and the 1.9 TDI since the middle of 2008 use the seven-speed dry clutch version.

As for the 2010 model, an updated version of the 2.0 TDI engine was launched with common rail technology. The engine was introduced in the Volkswagen Passat in the models from 2008.

Touran Hy Motion and Hybrid

The Touran Hy Motion is Volkswagen's Hydrogen Development concept.

In 2008, Shanghai-Volkswagen with Tongji University had released a Touran Hybrid, as part of the lead up to the 2008 Beijing Olympic Games.

A prototype of the Touran Hybrid was shown with a  electric motor in conjunction with a  petrol engine, the transmission will most likely be Volkswagen's Direct-Shift Gearbox (DSG).

Awards and safety
The Touran won What Car?s 2005 Compact Van of the Year award.
The Touran scored a maximum five star Euro NCAP crash safety rating.

Second generation (Typ 5T; 2015) 

The second generation Touran was introduced at the 2015 Geneva Motor Show. It uses the Volkswagen Group MQB platform and offers increased cabin space, four new engines with 19% less fuel consumption, and an array of new advanced driver-assistance systems and infotainment options. Autoradio with Apple CarPlay and Android Auto is included as an option.

Visually, the car resembles Golf Sportsvan with an elongated rear trunk.

China market 

The Touran currently serves as the successor to the Volkswagen Santana in Shanghai's taxi fleet since October 2018, as the Santana was phased out. Qiangsheng, one of the largest taxi firms in Shanghai, stated that the Touran offered greater passenger comfort over its predecessor. 100 new electric cabs were also added to the taxi fleet. The Chinese market Touran L has the same wheelbase as the european model. It is available in 280TSI and 330TSI trims with the 1.4 litre TSI, known as the CSS in China, available on 280TSI models and the 1.8 litre TSI for 330TSI models.  A 5 speed manual gearbox option is available on 280TSI models along with the 7 speed direct shift gearbox. 330TSI models come standard with the latter gearbox. The Touran L came standard in 5 seater configurations only when new. Pricing in 2016 ranged between 155,800 yuan and 230,800 yuan with 7 trim levels (23,850 to 35,330 USD - January 2021 exchange rate). Trim levels were known as: 280TSI Fashion (manual and DSG), 280TSI Comfort (manual and DSG), 280TSI Elegant (DSG only), 280TSI Deluxe and 330TSI Deluxe. A 1.6 litre engine was only available for the 2018 model year under the Fashion trim level. Six-seater and seven-seater configurations were added to the range for the 2018 model year onwards. 

As of January 2021, for the 2021 model year, only one model, the 280TSI was available. Trim levels are known as: Fashion (7-seater), Comfort (7-seater), Extension (6 and 7 seater) and Deluxe (6 and 7 seater). Pricing ranges between 151,800 yuan and 194,800 yuan (23,235 to 29,820 USD - January 2021 exchange rate).

Additionally, in 2018 Cross Touran L was announced, being still the same wheelbase, but with plastic wheel arches and chassis sitting 23mm higher.

Awards 
 In January 2021, the Touran 1.5 TSI 150 SE was named MPV of the Year by What Car? magazine. What Car? awarded the Touran five stars out of five in its review of the car.

Engine specifications

Gallery

References

External links

 International VW Touran Website

2010s cars
Cars introduced in 2003
Compact MPVs
Euro NCAP small MPVs
Front-wheel-drive vehicles
Touran